Kwame is an Akan masculine given name among the Akan people (such as the Ashanti and Fante) in Ghana which is given to a boy born on Saturday. Traditionally in Ghana, a child would receive their Akan day name during their Outdooring, eight days after birth. 

According to Akan tradition, people born on particular days exhibit certain characteristics or attributes. Kwame has the appellation "Atoapoma" or "Oteanankannuro" meaning "combat ready."

The day naming tradition in Ghana extends to folk characters such as Anansi and deities. Traditional Akan religion states that God created himself on Saturday and is therefore also named "Kwame".

Origin and meaning of Kwame 
In the Akan culture, day names are derived from deities. Kwame originated from Koyame and the Akan day name God. The name Kwame means extremes in fortune, health and spirituality; versatile, idealistic and intuitive. Males named Kwame are reputed to be talented and good problem solvers.

Male variants of Kwame 
Variant spellings include  Kwamé, Kouamé, Kwami, Kwamena, and Kwamina, according to the various Akan subgroups. It is spelt Kwame by the Akuapem and Ashanti subgroups, while the Fante subgroup spell it as Kwamena or Kwamina.

Female version of Kwame 
In the Akan culture and other local cultures in Ghana, day names come in pairs for males and females. The variant of the name used for a female child born on Saturday is Ama.

Notable people with the name 
The most well-known bearer of the name was Kwame Nkrumah, President of Ghana and a founder of Pan-Africanism - mainly due to whom the name spread also to non-Ghanaians.

People with this name include:
 Kwamé (American rapper)
 Kwame (Australian rapper)
 Kwame Alexander, American author
 Kwame Anthony Appiah, a Ghanaian-British philosopher of semantics and racism
 Kwame Awuah (born 1995), Canadian soccer player
 Kwame Brown, American former basketball player
 Kwame R. Brown (born 1970), American politician
 Kwame Dawes, Ghanaian poet currently living in America, managing editor of the Prairie Schooner literary journal
 Kwame Harris (born 1982), former American football player
 Kwame Holman, American producer, correspondent, and congressional correspondent
 Kwame Kenyatta, an American politician
 Kwame Kilpatrick, former mayor of Detroit, Michigan
 Kwame Nkrumah (originally Francis Nwia Kofi Ngonloma), a Ghanaian politician (and for a time Life President) and one of the founders of Pan-Africanism
 Kwame Raoul, Illinois Attorney General
 Kwame Somburu (Paul Boutelle), an American socialist political activist
 Kwame Tucker, a Bermudian cricketer
 Kwame Ture (Stokely Carmichael), a Trinidadian-American black activist and leader of the Student Nonviolent Coordinating Committee and the Black Panther Party
Kwame Vaughn (born 1990), American basketball player for Maccabi Haifa in the Israeli Basketball National League
 Kwamena Bartels, a Ghanaian politician and former government minister of the New Patriotic Party
 Kwamena Ahwoi, a Ghanaian politician who served as Minister for Local Government and Rural Development from 1990 to 2001 and Minister of Foreign Affairs in 1997
 Kwamina Ropapa Mensah, a Ghanaian footballer who plays for Nashville SC in the USL Championship
 Osei Kwame Panyin, eighteenth-century leader of the Ashanti Confederacy, in what is southern and central Ghana today
Paul Kwame, Ghanaian footballer

References

Fictional character
 Kwame (Captain Planet), a fictional character in the animated television series Captain Planet and the Planeteers
 Kwame, a fictional character in British television series I May Destroy You.

Given names
Ashanti given names
Akan given names
Masculine given names